Zapala is a department located in the center of Neuquén Province, Argentina.

Geography
The Department limits with Confluencia Department at the East, Añelo Department at the northeast, Picún Leufú Department at southeast, Catán Lil Department at southwest and Picunches Department at northwest.

Departments of Neuquén Province